Home is the debut solo studio album by the American artist Carrie Akre.

Track listing
The River - 1:16
Humdrum - 4:18
Blind - 4:16
Reflection - 4:23
Ruling Feelings - 2:57
Grey - 4:50
Home - 5:23
Limbo - 3:21
Hail, Hail - 4:30

External links
Home at Allmusic

References

Carrie Akre albums
2000 debut albums